Eulima victoriae is a species of sea snail, a marine gastropod mollusk in the family Eulimidae. The species is one of a number within the genus Eulima.

Distribution
This marine species is endemic to Australia and occurs off Victoria.

References

 Gatliff, J.H. & Gabriel, C.J. 1914. On some new species of Victorian marine Mollusca. Proceedings of the Royal Society of Victoria n.s. 27(1): 94-98, pls 14-16

External links
 To World Register of Marine Species

victoriae
Gastropods described in 1914
Gastropods of Australia